FC Santa Coloma, an association football club based in Santa Coloma, Andorra la Vella, Andorra, was founded in 1986. They, along with all other clubs in Andorra, participated in an amateur league without a structure or affiliation with any official institution until 1995, when they were founder members of the Primera Divisió (First Division) which became the top level of the Andorran football league system. The club is the most successful team in the division with 13 league titles, including the 1994–95 amateur league title which the Andorran Football Federation counts as an official league title. The 2009–10 Primera Divisió was won by the club without losing a game.

Along with league the club also competes in the Copa Constitució (Andorra Cup), the national football cup competition in Andorra. They are the most successful team in this competition too, winning it nine times. The 2003–04 season saw the introduction of the Andorran Supercup, a single match at the beginning of the season between the winners of the Primera Divisió and the Copa Constitució. Due to their regular domestic success FC Santa Coloma have qualified for the Supercup nearly every season with the exception of the 2013 edition. Their seven supercup wins is the most by a single club, meaning FC Santa Coloma are the most successful team in all three of Andorra's domestic football competitions. The club has never been relegated from the top division.

The Andorran Football Federation joined as a member of both the International Federation of Association Football (FIFA) and the Union of European Football Associations (UEFA) in 1996, allowing football clubs in Andorra to enter UEFA competitions. FC Santa Coloma first qualified for Europe with their league win in 2001, entering the qualifying round for the 2001–02 UEFA Cup, losing 8–1 on aggregate to Yugoslav team Partizan. Their first season in the UEFA Champions League was in the 2008–09 qualifying rounds, losing 7–2 on aggregate to Lithuanian team FBK Kaunas. Since 2007 the club has qualified for Europe each season entering either the Champions League or the Europa League (known as the UEFA Cup up to 2009). Their best run has been reaching the second qualifying round in both competitions.

Key

W = Winners
RU = Runners-up
SF = Semi-finals
QF = Quarter-finals
R3 = Third round
QR2 = Second qualifying round
QR1 = First qualifying round
PR = Preliminary round
DNQ = Did not qualify
? = Result not known

Seasons

Notes

References

Seasons
Santa Coloma